Alon Shaya (born 1979) is an Israeli-American celebrity chef and restaurant owner. He is the author of several cookbooks and the owner of a hospitality and restaurant consulting business, Pomegranate Hospitality.

Early years and education 
Shaya was born in Bat Yam, Israel and raised in Philadelphia, where he moved at the age of four. He attended Harriton High School and the Central Montco Technical School. He trained at the Culinary Institute of America.

Career 
Shaya began his culinary career as an intern at the Rio Hotel and Casino in Las Vegas. He also cooked in restaurants in St. Louis and Italy. He moved to New Orleans in 2001, and later opened his namesake restaurant there. He opened the Pomegranate Hospitality company in 2017  and two new restaurants, Saba in New Orleans and Safta in Denver.  Shaya was fired from the Besh Restaurant Group in 2017 when initial sexual harassment allegations were being publicized by employees of the company. He sued Besh to remove his name from the eatery but lost that case in an out of court settlement in 2018.

In 2017, Alon formed Pomegranate Hospitality to create a space where meaningful, lasting relationships are created, community engagement prospers, and cultural differences are celebrated.  Pomegranate Hospitality hopes to foster opportunities for colleagues, partners and friends in a comfortable environment, helping all involved to achieve their personal and professional goals.

He was a judge on the 15th season of Top Chef.

In March 2018, Alon published his debut cookbook, "Shaya: An Odyssey of Food, My Journey Back to Israel" (Knopf). Part memoir and part cookbook, Alon shares his deeply personal journey of survival and discovery, exploring the evolution of a cuisine and the transformative power and magic of food and cooking. Readers learn the secret to making Shaya's acclaimed pita bread while hearing the food stories that have shaped his life.

Later in 2018, Saba opened its doors in May 2018 in Uptown, New Orleans & Safta opened its doors in August 2018 in the River North neighborhood of Denver. Both restaurants reflect Chef Alon Shaya's heritage, a journey through food and beverage which pays homage to the culinary landscape of Israel. With influences that stem from the Middle East, Europe and North Africa, Saba and Safta reflect a collection of moments where food and culture have crossed paths, offering a taste of this ever-evolving cuisine. Wood fired pita bread baked steps from the table soaks up the flavors of Bulgaria, Yemen, Syria, Morocco, Turkey, Palestine and Greece to name a few. 

In 2019 he took chefs from his restaurants to Israel on a culinary tour so they could incorporate those tastes and flavors in the American establishments. He also participated in Galileat, a food workshop in Galilee.

In 2020 he presented at a Blackberry Farm event. He is a brand ambassador for Camellia Brand.

In mid 2021, Pomegranate Hospitality and the Four Season Hotel & Private Residences New Orleans will open the hotel’s signature restaurant and lobby bar. The restaurant, Miss River, will represent Alon & Emily’s love letter to Louisiana.

Awards 
In 2010, Shaya was named one of Esquire Magazine’s “Chefs to Watch”  and in 2012 he was named Chef of the Year by Eater New Orleans.

He listed as one of the “50 People Who are Changing the South” by Southern Living Magazine in 2015. He was also listed as one of the “50 Most Influential Jews in America” by the Forward.

He was nominated for five James Beard Awards and won two:

 2015: James Beard Award for Best Chef, based on his cooking as the executive chef at Domenica 
 2016: the Shaya eatery was awarded the James Beard Foundation Award for the country's best new restaurant.

He won the “Youth Advocate Award” from Liberty's Kitchen, and was honored by InspireNOLA Schools for his work with Edna Karr Charter High School.

Publications 
He has contributed to KITCHN magazine. In 2018 he published Shaya: An Odyssey of Food, My Journey Back to Israel (Knopf).

Philanthropy 
In 2016, Shaya partnered with his high school home economics teacher, Donna Barnett, to form the Shaya Barnett Foundation, which brings culinary education to high schools. 

During the COVID-19 pandemic, Shaya turned his closed restaurants into soup kitchens offering free meals to furloughed hospitality-industry workers. He also partnered with chef Edward Lee in founding the Restaurant Worker Relief program.

He is a chef fundraiser for No Kid Hungry, Alex’s Lemonade Stand, and DC Central Kitchen/Martha’s Table.

Personal 
Shaya is married to Emily Ostuw, and lives in New Orleans.

References 

1979 births
Living people
Israeli television chefs
21st-century Israeli Jews
Cookbook writers
Jewish Israeli writers
James Beard Foundation Award winners